Leptostylus castaneovirescens is a species of longhorn beetle of the subfamily Lamiinae. It was described by Zayas in 1975 and is known from Cuba.

References

Leptostylus
Beetles described in 1975
Endemic fauna of Cuba